Khyber Pakhtunkhwa Oil & Gas Company Limited commonly known as KPOGCL, is a provincial oil and gas holding company based in Peshawar, Pakistan. It was established by Government of Khyber Pakhtunkhwa in 2013. KPOGCL is a member of the Pakistan Petroleum Exploration and Production Companies Association. The Acting chief executive officer of the company is Nasir Khan .

In January 2016, the Federal Government of Pakistan allowed KPOGCL for the first time in country's history to sell seepage crude oil.

In 2015, the company signed a memorandum of understanding with Russian exploration company Rosgeologia on joint exploration and production activities.

In addition to its own activities, the company provides services to other oil and gas companies in seismic data acquisition, geological and geo-physical surveys, logistic support and security arrangement.

References

External links 

 

Oil and gas companies of Pakistan
Government-owned companies of Pakistan
Energy companies established in 2013
Non-renewable resource companies established in 2013
Pakistani companies established in 2013
Economy of Khyber Pakhtunkhwa